Wyatt James Turner (January 5, 1909 – September 19, 1986) was an American Negro league catcher in the 1930s.

A native of Pittsburgh, Pennsylvania, Turner played for the Homestead Grays in 1939 and served in the US Navy during World War II. He died in Pittsburgh in 1986 at age 77.

References

External links
 and Seamheads

1909 births
1986 deaths
Homestead Grays players
Baseball catchers
Baseball players from Pittsburgh
United States Navy personnel of World War II
African Americans in World War II
African-American United States Navy personnel